Piz de Mucia is a mountain of the Swiss Lepontine Alps, overlooking San Bernardino in the canton of Graubünden. It lies south-east of the Zapporthorn, between the valleys of Calanca and Mesolcina.

References

External links
 Piz de Mucia on Hikr

Mountains of Switzerland
Mountains of Graubünden
Mountains of the Alps
Lepontine Alps
Two-thousanders of Switzerland